The following list is of films produced in Norway in the 2010s:

2010s

References

External links
 Norwegian film at the Internet Movie Database

2010s
Lists of 2010s films
Films